First Church of Christ, Congregational may refer to:

First Church of Christ, Congregational (Farmington, Connecticut)
First Church Congregational, Methuen, Massachusetts
 First Church of Christ, Congregational (Springfield, Massachusetts)

See also
First Church of Christ (disambiguation)